Tej Parkash Singh is an Indian Politician from the state of Punjab.

Constituency
Singh represented the Payal, Ludhiana constituency from 2002-2007 and 2007-2012.

Posts
Singh was the transport Minister in the Government of Punjab.

Political Party  
Singh is from the Indian National Congress.

Family
Singh's father  Beant Singh was the Chief Minister of Punjab from 1992–1995.

References 

Living people
Indian National Congress politicians
People from Punjab, India
Indian National Congress politicians from Punjab, India
Year of birth missing (living people)